A Gentleman in Tails (Spanish:Un caballero de frac) is a 1931 American comedy film directed by Roger Capellani and Carlos San Martín and starring Roberto Rey, Gloria Guzmán and Rosita Díaz Gimeno. It is the Spanish-language version of the 1927 film Evening Clothes. It was made by Paramount Pictures at the Joinville Studios in Paris. A French-language version The Man in Evening Clothes was also released the same year.

Cast
 Roberto Rey as André de Dussange
 Gloria Guzmán as Totoche
 Rosita Díaz Gimeno as Susana de Dussange
 Gabriel Algara as Pierre D'Allouville
 Luis Llaneza as Buffetaut
 Antonio Martínez as Soyer
 Marita Ángeles as Baby
 José Medina as Louis
 Manuel Kuindós as Guildé
 Antoñita Colomé as Ninette
 Antonio Monjardin as Firmin
 Carlos Martínez Baena as Maître
 Pedro Elviro

References

Bibliography
  Eva Woods Peiró. White Gypsies: Race and Stardom in Spanish Musical Films. U of Minnesota Press, 2012.

External links
 

1931 films
1931 comedy films
1930s Spanish-language films
Spanish-language American films
American comedy films
Films directed by Roger Capellani
Remakes of American films
American multilingual films
Films shot at Joinville Studios
Paramount Pictures films
American films based on plays
American black-and-white films
1931 multilingual films
1930s American films